Saint-Thomas-en-Argonne (literally Saint-Thomas in Argonne) is a commune in the Marne department in north-eastern France.

See also
Communes of the Marne department

References

Saintthomasenargonne